Stefan Gertler (born on 05.08.1972 in Duisburg) is a German singer. He first came on RTL TV on the German version of Britain's Got Talent, Das Supertalent.

Stefan performed the song Home by Michael Bublé on 15 October 2011.

References (in German)

 Das Supertalent | Die Talent-Show bei RTL
 Das Supertalent | Die Talent-Show bei RTL
 http://www.clipfish.de/special/supertalent/video/3680908/supertalent-2011-stefan-gertler-singt-home/
 https://www.facebook.com/pages/Die-offizielle-Stefan-Gertler-Fan-Seite/261524360555252?sk=info

21st-century German male singers
Living people
Year of birth missing (living people)